Hydriomena is a genus of moths in the family Geometridae described by Jacob Hübner in 1825.

Species
 Hydriomena albifasciata (Packard, 1874)
 Hydriomena albimontanata McDunnough, 1939
 Hydriomena arida (Butler, 1879)
 Hydriomena arizonata Barnes & McDunnough, 1917
 Hydriomena barnesata Swett, 1909
 Hydriomena bistriolata (Zeller, 1872)
 Hydriomena borussata Barnes & McDunnough, 1918
 Hydriomena bryanti McDunnough, 1943
 Hydriomena californiata Packard, 1871
 Hydriomena canescens Philpott, 1918
 Hydriomena catalinata McDunnough, 1943
 Hydriomena charlestonia McDunnough, 1954
 Hydriomena chiricahuata Swett, 1909
 Hydriomena clarkei (Howes, 1917)
 Hydriomena clarki W. S. Wright, 1920
 Hydriomena cochiseata Swett, 1909
 Hydriomena costipunctata Barnes & McDunnough, 1912
 Hydriomena crokeri Swett, 1910
 Hydriomena cyriadoides McDunnough, 1954
 Hydriomena deltoidata (Walker, 1862)
 Hydriomena divisaria (Walker, 1860)
 Hydriomena edenata Swett, 1909
 Hydriomena exculpata Barnes & McDunnough, 1917
 Hydriomena expurgata Barnes & McDunnough, 1918
 Hydriomena feminata McDunnough, 1944
 Hydriomena furcata (Thunberg, 1784) – July highflyer
 Hydriomena furculoides Barnes & McDunnough, 1917
 Hydriomena furtivata McDunnough, 1939
 Hydriomena glaucata (Packard, 1874)
 Hydriomena gracillima McDunnough, 1944
 Hydriomena hemizona Meyrick, 1897
 Hydriomena henshawi Swett, 1912
 Hydriomena impluviata (Denis & Schiffermüller, 1775) – May highflyer
 Hydriomena iolanthe Hudson, 1939
 Hydriomena irata Swett, 1910
 Hydriomena johstoni McDunnough, 1954
 Hydriomena macdunnoughi Swett, 1918
 Hydriomena magnificata Taylor, 1906
 Hydriomena manzanita Taylor, 1906
 Hydriomena marinata Barnes & McDunnough, 1917
 Hydriomena mississippiensis McDunnough, 1952
 Hydriomena modestata Barnes & McDunnough, 1917
 Hydriomena morosata Barnes & McDunnough, 1917
 Hydriomena muscata Barnes & McDunnough, 1917
 Hydriomena nevadae Barnes & McDunnough, 1917
 Hydriomena nubilofasciata (Packard, 1871)
 Hydriomena obliquilinea Barnes & McDunnough, 1917
 Hydriomena peratica Rindge, 1956
 Hydriomena perfracta Swett, 1910
 Hydriomena pluviata (Guenée, 1857)
 Hydriomena purpurifera (Fereday, 1884)
 Hydriomena quinquefasciata (Packard, 1871)
 Hydriomena regulata Pearsall, 1909
 Hydriomena renunciata (Walker, 1862)
 Hydriomena rita McDunnough, 1954
 Hydriomena rixata (Felder & Rogenhofer, 1875) 
 Hydriomena ruberata (Freyer, 1831) – ruddy highflyer
 Hydriomena septemberata McDunnough, 1952
 Hydriomena shasta Barnes & McDunnough, 1917
 Hydriomena sierrae Barnes & McDunnough, 1917
 Hydriomena similaris Hulst, 1896
 Hydriomena speciosata (Packard, 1874)
 Hydriomena sperryi McDunnough, 1952
 Hydriomena transfigurata Swett, 1912
 Hydriomena tuolumne Barnes & McDunnough, 1917

The extinct species Hydriomena? protrita Cockerell, 1922 from the Priabonian age Florissant Formation is possibly a member of this genus.

References

External links

 
Hydriomenini